Gibraltar Peak is a peak in Antarctica.

Location
The peak lies situated on the Pennell Coast, a portion of Antarctica lying between Cape Williams and Cape Adare.

History
It was named by the New Zealand Geological Survey Antarctic Expedition, 1967–68, because it is shaped like the famous Rock of Gibraltar.  The name was officially decided by the U.S. Board on Geographic Names in 1969.

It is included in the  United States Gazetteer and the SCAR Composite Gazetteer of Antarctica.

Biodiversity
The Australian Antarctic Data Centre has not recorded any fauna near the peak. Bryum, a type of moss, been located near the peak.

References

Mountains of Victoria Land
Pennell Coast